Robert Hess may refer to:

Robert Hess (cocktail enthusiast), American cocktail enthusiast, blogger and technology evangelist for Microsoft
Robert Hess (chess player) (born 1991), American chess grandmaster
Robert Hess (college president) (1932–1992), American historian and academic administrator
Bob Hess (born 1955), Canadian ice hockey defenceman
Bob Hess (wrestler) (1910–1998), American Olympic wrestler
Robert Hess (artist) (1935–2014), American sculptor and art educator
Robert G. Hess (1908–1995), American mechanical engineer and business executive